Didymopanax cordatus is a flowering plant in the family Araliaceae. It is native to Brazil.

References 

Flora of Brazil
cordatus